Muna Easa Al Gurg is a businesswoman and philanthropist from the United Arab Emirates and is currently the vice chairperson and managing director of Retail at Easa Saleh Al Gurg Group.

She ranked amongst the 50 most influential Arab women in the Middle East by Arabian Business magazine in 2021.

Career 
Al Gurg obtained her BA in Business Administration from the American University in Dubai and her Executive MBA in Business Administration from London Business School.

She started her career with Saatchi & Saatchi in Dubai. In 2001 she joined her family's business, the Easa Saleh Al Gurg Group, a conglomerate based in the United Arab Emirates, as Director of Marketing and Communications. She worked closely with her father and founder of the business Easa Saleh Al Gurg and her eldest sister Raja Al Gurg who is Managing Director of the business. Since 2009, she has been a board member of the company and Director of Retail, responsible for strategy and operational development of the group’s international and local retail brands.

In July 2020, Al Gurg joined the board of HSBC Bank Middle East Limited.

Initiatives and Philanthropy 

Since 2008, Al Gurg has been Chairwoman of Young Arab Leaders UAE, which promotes education, entrepreneurship and youth development in the UAE. 

Al Gurg is an advocate for a greater role for women in business. Within Easa Saleh Al Gurg Group, she started the Al Gurg Women's Empowerment Forum, a program providing a platform for women to voice their opinions to company board members. In 2015 she launched the Muna Al Gurg Scholarship at London Business School, supporting female students studying on the school’s MBA and Executive MBA program.

Al Gurg has served on the board of several non-profit organizations, such as the Emirates Foundation for Youth Development. At the Easa Saleh Al Gurg Charity Foundation, she is responsible for strategy and initiatives in the UAE and internationally, including primary education support for underprivileged children in Zanzibar. She is a member of the United Nations High Commissioner for Refugees Sustainability Board, which is mandated to provide innovative and sustainable solutions to refugees in the MENA region.

Al Gurg is a founding board member of Endeavor UAE, the UAE-branch of a non-profit organization promoting high-impact entrepreneurship in emerging and growth markets.

Other activities 

Al Gurg is a Fellow of the Middle East Leadership Initiative of the Aspen Institute and a member of the Aspen Global Leadership Network. She is an opinion columnist for Gulf News, a Dubai daily English newspaper. 

In 2012, she was a member of the judging panel on the UAE business reality show The Entrepreneur.

Al Gurg invested in the Middle East's largest technology startup Careem which was acquired by Uber in March 2019 for $3.1 Billion.

References 

Emirati women in business
Year of birth missing (living people)
Living people